The Brightonomicon is a novel by British fantasy author Robert Rankin. The title parodies that of the fictional grimoire Necronomicon from the Cthulhu Mythos. The author lives in Brighton, England, and the book is set in an accurate fictional depiction of the town. The book is based on "The Brighton Zodiac", a map consisting of carriageway constellations found in the city of Brighton and Hove, similar to the purported landscape zodiacs of Glastonbury and Kingston. The 2010 edition features a new cover design and internal illustrations by Rankin himself, who studied at the Ealing School of Art and worked briefly as an illustrator in the 1970s.

Synopsis
The novel is set in Brighton, and concerns the grand high magus Hugo Rune (AKA The Reinventor of the Ocarina, the Mumbo Gumshoe, the Hokus Bloke, the Cosmic Dick, the Guru's Guru, the Perfect Master, the Lad Himself) and his quest to solve the mystery of the Brighton zodiac, with the aid of his amnesia-struck assistant, Rizla (revealed at the conclusion of the novel to be Jim Pooley of The Brentford Trilogy). They are opposed in the novel by Rune's arch foe, the evil Count Otto Black.

The following cases are featured:-

Audio adaptation 
The book was adapted into a 13-part full-cast audio drama in 2008 by Hokus Bloke Productions and BBC Audiobooks, starring Jason Isaacs, Martin Jarvis, Mark Wing-Davey, Sarah Douglas, Andy Serkis, Ben Miller and Michael Fenton Stevens, along with co-Executive Producers David Warner and Rupert Degas.

The audio series was re-edited into 28-minute, 30-minute episodes which was broadcast on the BBC digital and online radio station BBC7.
The 13 half-hour episodes were originally broadcast at 18:30 UK Time (with a 00:30 repeat) on Saturdays from 23 August 2008 to 15 November 2008, with each episode being available on the BBC iPlayer for six days after broadcast. The series has been repeated a number of times subsequently. It won eZine The Hub's 2008 Award for "Best Comedy (Audio)".

Cast

References

External links 
British Comedy Guide

Novels by Robert Rankin
2005 British novels
British fantasy novels
Novels set in Brighton
Victor Gollancz Ltd books